Aruna Beth Abrams (born January 16, 1975) is an American singer, songwriter, DJ, producer and pianist. She is best known as a vocalist in dance music since 2007 but has been working as DJ and producer of her own work since 2011. She resides in Los Angeles, California.

Early life and career
Aruna grew up in Flemington, New Jersey, the daughter of Beatrice and Larry S. Abrams, a clinical pharmaceutical researcher. Her name was suggested by her Indian godfather and means "sunrise" in Hindi. She began studying classical piano and later, jazz improvisation, and left her hometown to study piano as well as film scoring and electronic music production at the Berklee College of Music, Boston. In 1996 she worked on the 'Portal' project together with members of the progressive metal band Cynic, providing vocals and keyboards. This material was eventually released in 2012 as The Portal Tapes, under the Cynic name. At Berklee, Abrams completed courses in music production, audio editing and sound design. She graduated in 2002.

Growing up, Abrams listened mostly to 70s and 80s pop, which changed when 'my tastes started diversifying and I got into hair, thrash and death metal as a teen'. She first began performing as an acoustic singer-songwriter at local coffee houses in Boston, and recorded the three-song demo Broken Circles, produced by Alain Mallet and mixed by Kevin Killen. In 2000 she was selected as the opening act for the Boston show of The Girls Room Tour showcase.

After graduating college, Abrams relocated to Los Angeles. In 2004, she recorded and self-released her first full-length album, Running Red Lights. While pursuing a career as a pop singer-songwriter, Aruna experienced early success when a number of her songs were featured on the MTV shows, Laguna Beach and The Hills. Her break-through was the co-written hit for Miley Cyrus entitled "I Got Nerve" for the 2006 #1 Billboard album, the Hannah Montana: Season One soundtrack. The song reached #67 on the Billboard Hot 100.

EDM vocals and songwriting career
In 2006, she was discovered through MySpace by her manager Stuart Squires, who began pitching her for dance collaborations. Six months later, Abrams was approached by The Thrillseekers to feature her vocals on a track. The collaboration was her introduction into the EDM world, supplying the track "Waiting Here For You". She has continued to work with other trance acts, including Cosmic Gate, ATB, Ronski Speed and Roger Shah. Together with Mark Eteson she recorded the single "Let Go", which was released on October 25, 2010, through the Anjunabeats label and later included on theVolume 8 compilation from the same label. Two years later the single "Live Forever" with Ferry Corsten was released and featured on the album WKND. She also appeared in her first video for the song. In 2013 she went on to collaborate with Armin van Buuren on "Won’t Let You Go" for his artist album Intense. On these collaborations she noted that 'writing my own lyrics and melodies is and has always been a non-negotiable. I just can't sell a song I didn't write in the quite same way'.

In the beginning of 2009, she was contacted by Myon (Mario Egeto) of DJ duo Myon & Shane 54 to work together on a track. After releasing "Helpless," both parties had ideas for track collaborations that didn't fit into their own artist personas, so the trio formed a new side project that they dubbed Velvetine. "Safe" was the first original track released by Velvetine in 2010 on Anjunabeats Volume 7 and was warmly received by fans and by Armin van Buuren, who crafted an intro mix for it and a mashup version with his track, "Face to Face". Velvetine's second single "The Great Divide" was released in 2012, reached #1 on the Beatport trance and dubstep charts and first played by Armin on A State of Trance #573.

DJ and production career
In 2011, Abrams decided to move into DJing, and has credited Myon & Shane 54 as the inspiration for her to make the transition. She started her own radio show, The Hot List in September 2011on DI.fm. In August 2012, she became the first solo female act to do a guest mix for Above & Beyond’s Trance Around the World radio show. Afterwards, The Hot List reached #14 on the iTunes Top 200 Music Podcasts chart. Touted by Tony McGuiness of Above & Beyond as "one of the most talented singer/songwriters around at the moment". Aruna joined Above & Beyond for a second time in November 2013, doing a guest mix for their podcast, Group Therapy.

In 2012, Aruna performed on the "A State of Pink" stage at Armin van Buuren's A State of Trance 550 festival in Den Bosch, Netherlands. A year later, she accompanied him with live vocals during his set at the Hollywood Palladium in LA. She has also performed live at Nocturnal Wonderland, Avalon Hollywood alongside Ferry Corsten and at Exchange LA with Myon & Shane54. She has performed live vocals and DJ sets internationally.

Abrams moved to the UK-based record label Enhanced Recordings in 2013. Her solo track "Reason to Believe" was her first single with the label and reached the #3 position on the Beatport Trance chart in August 2013. Remixes to "Reason to Believe" peaked at #7 and #9 in the Glitch Hop and Chillout charts, the latter a mix she self-produced. In 2014, Abrams released Amsterdam Enhanced together with AWD.

In 2015 she released the compilation Aruna - The Hot List Volume One a DJ Mix including her own work both as vocalist, remixer and producer. In support the digital single 'What If?' was made available. She has continued to write, produce and DJ, concentrating mostly on drum and bass.

In November 2016, she released the single "Ready To Go" with English music producer Rameses B featuring American vocalist Kingdøms on Monstercat. She also contributed to the remix of 'Time To Say Goodbye' by Mr FijiWiji originally from the Dogma EP. In 2017 she co-wrote the song 'Trust You' for the album Trust by the singer Jaqi Velasquez that reached #7 on the Billboard Latin Pop Album chart.

In September 2019, she made a return to the live stage as vocalist when she appeared at the Electric FAIRy tale festival.

Style 
Abrams 'went through the requisite Lilith phase' in college listening to mostly female artist such as Tori Amos and Sarah McLachlan. It began to influence most of her writing and 'it was around that time that I really began consciously honing my craft'.

During her career, Abrams has written a large number of trance tracks where she found herself 'limited by their structure, and also the imagery that they impose from a lyrical perspective, since the tracks and the sounds in trance are so big and lush and epic, the lyrics kinda have to follow suit, so they end up being somewhat abstract'. In general, her method of working centres on the melody before the lyrics are written. Abrams prefers 'the intimacy of pop lyric writing and arrangements, which allow the melody and the story of the song to be the main focus, not the kick drum and the lead lines'.

Discography
EPs
2001: Broken Circles

Albums
 2004: Running Red Lights

Compilation

 2015: Aruna - The Hot List Volume One

Featured singles
 2007: The Thrillseekers feat. Aruna – Waiting Here for You
 2008: Double Agents feat. Aruna – Electrified
 2008: George Acosta feat. Aruna - Fallin' Backwards
 2008: Ronski Speed feat. Aruna - All the Way - Pure Devotion
 2009: Cosmic Gate feat. Aruna - Under Your Spell - Sign of the Times
 2009: Filo & Peri feat. Aruna - Ashley - Nightplay
 2009: ATB feat. Aruna - My Saving Grace - Future Memories
 2009: Myon & Shane 54 feat. Aruna - Helpless
 2009: DJ Shah Feat. Aruna – Now or Never - Songbook
 2010: Velvetine – Safe (Wherever You Are)
 2010: Mike Shiver & Aruna - Everywhere You Are
 2010: Aruna with Mark Eteson - Let Go
 2011: Cosmic Gate & Myon & Shane 54 feat. Aruna - All Around You - Wake Your Mind
 2011: Cosmic Gate feat. Aruna - Free Falling (Barra) - Wake Your Mind
 2012: Ferry Corsten feat. Aruna - Live Forever - WKND
 2012: Velvetine - The Great Divide
 2012: Markus Schulz feat. Aruna - Sing Me Back to Life - Scream
 2012: Aruna - Save the Day
 2013: Myon & Shane 54 with Aruna - Lights
 2013: Armin van Buuren feat. Aruna - Won't Let You Go - Intense
 2013: Aruna - Reason to Believe 
 2013: Conjure One feat. Aruna - Still Holding On
 2014: Aruna - Start a Fire (Johan Malmgren Original Mix)
 2014: Aly & Fila feat. Aruna - The Other Shore
 2015: Aruna - The End (Husman Vs. Aruna Club Mix)
2015: Boom Jinx with Aruna - Light as a Feather
 2016: Mr FijiWiji, Direct & Aruna - Time to Say Goodbye
 2016: Aruna & Rameses B - Ready To Go (feat. KINGDØMS)
 2016: Aruna - What If/Sunrise
 2016: Aruna - All Of You (Ost & Meyer Vs. Aruna Mix)

References

External links
 
 Aruna discography on Discogs

American women singer-songwriters
Trance singers
1981 births
Living people
American heavy metal singers
American rock pianists
American women pianists
Berklee College of Music alumni
People from Flemington, New Jersey
Singer-songwriters from New Jersey
Monstercat artists
21st-century American women singers
21st-century American singers
21st-century American pianists
American women heavy metal singers